William Louis Shelton (born April 6, 1941) is an American guitarist and music producer.

Biography
During the 1960s, 1970s, and 1980s Shelton was a session musician working in recording studios around Hollywood.  Among his more notable session work was for the Monkees, including their first self-titled album, and both recordings of the Boyce and Hart songs, "Last Train to Clarksville", "Valleri", and "(Theme From) The Monkees". Shelton played the flamenco-style guitar solo on "Valleri", which Michael Nesmith had to mimic for the cameras on their TV series.  Even after the Monkees began playing on their own records, Shelton remained a favorite among their session players. Shelton was inducted into the Musicians Hall of Fame and Museum, the Arkansas Entertainers Hall of Fame and is a member of the famous group of LA session musicians known as "The Wrecking Crew".

Other recording credits include:
 
Marvin Gaye, 
Simon and Garfunkel, 
Stevie Wonder, 
Boz Scaggs,
Gladys Knight & the Pips, 
the Jackson 5, 
Neil Diamond, 
John Lennon, 
Barbra Streisand, 
the Carpenters, 
the Mamas & the Papas, 
Glen Campbell, 
Ella Fitzgerald, 
the Partridge Family, 
James Brown, 
Diana Ross,
Otis Spann, 
Whitney Houston, 
Joe Cocker, 
Kenny Rogers, 
Henry Mancini, 
Dave Grusin, 
Quincy Jones, 
Lalo Schifrin and
Victor Wooten.  He played the guitar solo on Lionel Richie's hit "Hello", Boz Scaggs's "Lowdown" and David Gates'  "Do You Believe He's Coming".

Shelton became a producer in the 1970s, working with recording artists including Seals and Crofts, Art Garfunkel, Amy Wooley, England Dan & John Ford Coley, as well as Australian acts Tracey Arbon,  Noiseworks and Southern Sons.  He remains active and continues to record, produce, and perform.

He is a 2007 inductee into the Musicians Hall of Fame as a member of the Wrecking Crew.  In 2013 he was inducted into the Arkansas Entertainers Hall of Fame.

Shelton, who now resides in Australia, was reunited with the surviving Monkees (Mike Nesmith and Micky Dolenz) during their 2019 Australian tour, and made a special guest appearance with the group, performing his famous guitar part live on "Last Train to Clarksville" at the group's Brisbane concert on 13 June 2019.

Selected discography

As leader
 Touch Me (Warner Bros. Records, 1969)
 Guitar (Lightyear, 1995)
 Hot & Spicy (Sin-Drome, 1998)
 Urban Culture (Lightyear, 2000)
 Nashville Guitars (Lightyear, 2000)
 Souvenir
 Jazz Cafe

As sideman
With Solomon Burke
 Electronic Magnetism (MGM Records, 1971)

With Glen Campbell
 Oh Happy Day (Capitol Records, 1970)
 The Last Time I Saw Her (Capitol Records, 1971)

With Vikki Carr
 Ms. America (Columbia Records, 1973)

With Sonny & Cher
 Mama Was a Rock and Roll Singer, Papa Used to Write All Her Songs (MCA Records, 1973)

With Merry Clayton
 Gimme Shelter (Ode Records, 1970)

With Neil Diamond
 Tap Root Manuscript (Uni Records, 1970)

With Cass Elliot
 Cass Elliot (RCA Victor, 1972)

With José Feliciano
 José Feliciano (Motown, 1981)

With Michael Franks
 Michael Franks (Brut, 1973)

With Marvin Gaye
 Let's Get It On (Tamla, 1973)

With Art Garfunkel
 Angel Clare (Columbia Records, 1973)
 Breakaway (Columbia Records, 1975)
 Fate for Breakfast (Columbia Records, 1979)

With Marjoe Gortner
 Bad, but Not Evil (Chelsea Records, 1972)

With Lani Hall
 Sun Down Lady (A&M Records, 1972)

With Dan Hill
 If Dreams Had Wings (Epic Records, 1980)

With Whitney Houston
 Whitney Houston (Arista Records, 1985)

With Al Kooper
 Easy Does It (Columbia Records, 1970)
 New York City (You're a Woman) (Columbia Records, 1971)

With Peggy Lee
 Norma Deloris Egstrom from Jamestown, North Dakota (Capitol Records, 1972)

With Lulu
 Lulu (Polydor Records, 1973)

With Melanie
 Photograph (Atlantic Records, 1976)
 Seventh Wave (Powderworks, 1983)

With Brenda Patterson
 Brenda Patterson (Playboy Records, 1973)

With Teddy Pendergrass
 Love Language (Asylum Records, 1984)

With Lionel Richie
 Can't Slow Down (Motown Records, 1983)
 Dancing on the Ceiling (Motown Records, 1986)

With Austin Roberts
 The Last Thing On My Mind (Chelsea Records, 1973)

With Kenny Rogers
 Share Your Love (Liberty Records, 1981)

With Boz Scaggs
 Silk Degrees (Columbia Records, 1976)

With Otis Spann
 Sweet Giant of the Blues (Blues Time, 1970)

With Barbra Streisand
 Stoney End (Columbia Records, 1971)
 Barbra Joan Streisand (Columbia Records, 1971)

With Sarah Vaughan
 Songs of The Beatles (Atlantic Records, 1981)

References

External links
 Soniiq Duo Home Page
 
 
 

1941 births
Musicians from Little Rock, Arkansas
American expatriates in Australia
Record producers from Arkansas
American session musicians
Living people
The Monkees
American Bahá'ís
Guitarists from Arkansas
20th-century American guitarists